Fukuoka is the capital city of Fukuoka Prefecture.

Fukuoka may also refer to:

Places
 Fukuoka, Gifu, a town in Gifu Prefecture, Japan
 Fukuoka, Toyama, a town in Toyama Prefecture, Japan
 Fukuoka 17, a World War II-era Japanese POW camp at the Mitsui Kozan Miike Kogyo-Sho coal mine and Mitsui Zinc Foundry in Shinminato, Omuta, Fukuoka Prefecture, Japan
 Fukuoka Domain, a Japanese domain of the Edo period, located in Hizen Province (in modern-day Fukuoka Prefecture)
 Fukuoka Prefecture, one of the 47 prefectures in Japan
 Fukuoka–Kitakyushu, a metropolitan area encompassing the cities of Fukuoka and Kitakyushu in Fukuoka Prefecture, Japan

Buildings and attractions
 Fukuoka Castle, an Edo-age castle on Fukuzaki Hill in Fukuoka, Japan
 Fukuoka Convention Center, a convention center complex in Fukuoka, Japan
 Fukuoka Dome, currently named as Fukuoka Yahoo! Japan Dome by naming rights, a baseball field located in Fukuoka, Japan, the home stadium of Fukuoka SoftBank Hawks
 Fukuoka Japan Temple, a temple of The Church of Jesus Christ of Latter-day Saints in Fukuoka, Japan
 Fukuoka Kokusai Center
 Fukuoka Municipal Zoo and Botanical Garden, a zoo and botanical garden in Fukuoka, Japan
 Fukuoka Tower, a 234-metre tall tower located in the Momochihama area of Fukuoka, Japan
 Sky Dream Fukuoka, a Ferris wheel in Fukuoka, Japan

Business
 Fukuoka Broadcasting System, a TV station broadcasting in Fukuoka Prefecture
 Fukuoka Futures Exchange, a former futures exchange based in Fukuoka, Japan

Education
 Fukuoka College of Health Sciences, a private junior college in Fukuoka, Japan
 Fukuoka Dental College, a private university in Fukuoka, Japan
 Fukuoka Institute of Technology, a private university in Fukuoka, Japan
 Fukuoka International University, a private university in Dazaifu, Fukuoka, Japan
 Fukuoka Jo Gakuin University, a private women's college in Fukuoka, Japan
 Fukuoka Junior College for Kindergarten Teachers, a private junior college in Dazaifu, Fukuoka, Japan
 Fukuoka Prefectural Fukuoka High School, a public senior high school located in Fukuoka, Japan
 Fukuoka Prefectural University, a public university in Tagawa, Fukuoka, Japan
 Fukuoka Social Medical Welfare University, a private university in Dazaifu, Fukuoka, Japan
 Fukuoka University, a private university in Fukuoka, Japan
 Fukuoka University of Economics, a private university in Dazaifu, Fukuoka, Japan
 Fukuoka University of Education, a national university in Munakata, Fukuoka, Japan
 Fukuoka Women's University, a public women's university in Fukuoka, Japan

Sports 
 Avispa Fukuoka, a Japanese professional football (soccer) club in Hakata, Fukuoka Prefecture, Japan
 Fukuoka Marathon, an international marathon race established in 1947 held in Fukuoka, Japan
 Fukuoka Red Warblers, a semi-professional baseball team in the Shikoku-Kyūshū Island League of Japan
 Fukuoka Sanix Blues, a Japanese rugby union team based in Munakata, Fukuoka Prefecture, Japan
 Fukuoka SoftBank Hawks, a Japanese baseball team based in Fukuoka, Japan

Transportation
 Fukuoka Airport, an international airport in Fukuoka, Japan
 Fukuoka City Subway, a subway line in Fukuoka, Japan consisting of the Kūkō (Airport) Line, the Hakozaki Line, and the Nanakuma Line
 Fukuoka Subway 1000 series, an electric multiple unit operated by the Fukuoka City Subway on the Hakozaki Kūkō Lines in Fukuoka, Japan
 Fukuoka Subway 2000 series, an electric multiple unit operated by the Fukuoka City Subway on the Hakozaki Kūkō Lines in Fukuoka, Japan
 Fukuoka Subway 3000 series, an electric multiple unit operated by the Fukuoka City Subway on the Hakozaki Kūkō Lines in Fukuoka, Japan
 Fukuokakūkō Station, a Fukuoka City Subway station serving Fukuoka Airport in Fukuoka, Japan
 Fukuoka Station, a train station in Takaoka, Toyama Prefecture, Japan
 Kami-Fukuoka Station, a railway station on the Tōbu Tōjō Line in Fujimino, Saitama, Japan
 Minami-Fukuoka Station, a train station on the Kagoshima Main Line in Hakata, Fukuoka, Japan
 Nishitetsu Fukuoka (Tenjin) Station, a train station located in Chūō-ku, Fukuoka, Japan

Other uses 
 Fukuoka (surname)
 Fukuoka clan, the feudal clan who owned the Chikuzen country
 Fukuoka (film), a 2019 film by Zhang Lü
 8159 Fukuoka, a Main-belt Asteroid discovered in 1990
 FM Fukuoka, an FM radio station broadcasting in Fukuoka Prefecture
 Fukuoka Asian Culture Prize, a series of prizes established in 1990 by Fukuoka, Japan and the Yokatopia Foundation
 Roman Catholic Diocese of Fukuoka, a diocese located in Fukuoka, Japan